Pedobacter rhizosphaerae is a species of Gram-negative bacteria, first isolated from rhizosphere soil of Brassica campestris, hence its name. Its type strain is 01-96(T) (=KACC 14938(T) =NBRC 107690(T)).

References

Further reading
Whitman, William B., et al., eds. Bergey's manual® of systematic bacteriology. Vol. 5. Springer, 2012.

External links
LPSN
Type strain of Pedobacter rhizosphaerae at BacDive -  the Bacterial Diversity Metadatabase

Sphingobacteriia
Bacteria described in 2011